EF Eridani (abbreviated EF Eri, sometimes incorrectly referred to as EF Eridanus) is a variable star of the type known as polars, AM Herculis stars, or magnetic cataclysmic variable stars.  Historically it has varied between apparent magnitudes 14.5 and 17.3, although since 1995 it has generally remained at the lower limit. The star system consists of a white dwarf with a substellar-mass former star in orbit.

EF Eridani B
The substellar mass in orbit around the white dwarf is a star that lost all of its gas to the white dwarf. What remains is an object with a mass of 0.05 solar masses, or about 53 Jupiter masses, which is too small to continue fusion, and does not have the composition of a super-planet, brown dwarf, or white dwarf. There is no category for such a stellar remnant.

It is theorized that 500 million years ago, the white dwarf started to cannibalize its partner, when they were separated by 7 million km. As it lost mass, the regular star spiraled inward, until now they are separated by a mere 700,000 km.

Another former star orbits the pulsar PSR J1719-1438.

See also
 AM Herculis
 Cataclysmic variable star
 Polar (cataclysmic variable)
 Variable stars
 Stellar remnants
 PSR J1719-1438 b, a planetary-mass former star that was eroded by its binary star partner, PSR J1719-1438
PSR J1544+4937 b
PSR B1957+20 b

References

External links
 (CNN) Faded star defies description 
 AAVSO charts for EF Eridani

Polars (cataclysmic variable stars)
Eridanus (constellation)
Eridani, EF
Eclipsing binaries